Warner Canyon is a small ski area in the U.S. state of Oregon. It is located in the Warner Mountains of south-central Oregon. Operating since 1938, the ski area was once within the Fremont National Forest, but the land is now owned by Lake County; a land swap was completed between the USFS and Lake County in 1998.

There is one triple chairlift serving the hill, with two landings. The area is operated by a local non-profit, the Fremont Highlanders Ski Club.

References

External links
Warner Canyon Facebook page

Ski areas and resorts in Oregon
Buildings and structures in Lake County, Oregon
Tourist attractions in Lake County, Oregon